Between 1970 and 1979, there were 117 Thor missiles launched, of which 108 were successful, giving a 92.3% success rate.

NASA used it to launch its own satellites, as well as to launch satellites for foreign governments and companies.

Launch statistics

Rocket configurations

Launch sites

Launch outcomes

1970 
There were 19 Thor missiles launched in 1970. 18 of the 19 launches were successful, giving a 94.7% success rate.

1971 
There were 14 Thor missiles launched in 1971. 12 of the 14 launches were successful, giving an 85.7% success rate.

1972
There were 11 Thor missiles launched in 1972. All 11 launches were successful.

1973
There were 7 Thor missiles launched in 1973. 6 of the 7 launches were successful, giving an 85.7% success rate.

1974
There were 9 Thor missiles launched in 1974. 8 of the 9 launches were successful, giving an 88.9% success rate.

1975
There were 16 Thor missiles launched in 1975. All 16 launches were successful.

1976
There were 12 Thor missiles launched in 1976. 11 of the 12 launches were successful, giving a 91.7% success rate.

1977
There were 12 Thor missiles launched in 1977. 10 of the 12 launches were successful, giving an 83.3% success rate.

1978
There were 12 Thor missiles launched in 1978. All 12 launches were successful.

1979
There were 5 Thor missiles launched in 1979. 4 of the 5 launches were successful, giving an 80% success rate.

References 

Lists of Thor and Delta launches
Lists of Thor launches
Lists of Delta launches